Ramón Alexander Torres (born January 22, 1993) is a Dominican professional baseball infielder who is a free agent. He previously played in Major League Baseball (MLB) for the Kansas City Royals.

Career

Kansas City Royals
Torres signed with the Kansas City Royals as an international free agent on May 28, 2010. He made his professional debut with the Dominican Summer League Royals. He played for the DSL Royals the next year, slashing .260/.351/.397 with 2 home runs and 24 RBI. In 2012, he spent the year with the rookie ball AZL Royals, batting .316/.385/.430 with 3 home runs and 27 RBI. He split the 2013 season between the rookie ball Burlington Royals and the Single-A Lexington Legends, posting a .257/.294/.365 batting line with 3 home runs and 25 RBI. The next year, Torres split the season between Lexington and the High-A Wilmington Blue Rocks, accumulating a .285/.329/.391 batting line with career-highs in home runs (5) and RBI (34). He split the 2015 season between the Double-A Northwest Arkansas Naturals and Wilmington, slashing .264/.308/.354 with 5 home runs and 31 RBI.

The Royals added him to their 40-man roster after the 2015 season. He spent the entire year split between Northwest Arkansas and the Triple-A Omaha Storm Chasers, hitting .262/.311/.328 with 3 home runs and 29 RBI. He was assigned to Omaha to begin the 2017 season, and was called up to the Royals on June 7. He made his major league debut that night starting at second base, and went 2-4 with an RBI double in a win over the Houston Astros. He finished his rookie season batting .243/.291/.284 with 4 RBI in 33 games. In 2018, Torres spent the bulk of the season in Omaha, but appeared in 9 major league games for the Royals, going 5-for-28 with 1 RBI. On November 2, 2018, Torres was outrighted off of the 40-man roster and subsequently elected free agency.

Chicago White Sox
On February 19, 2019, Torres signed a minor league deal with the Chicago White Sox organization. He split the year between the Double-A Birmingham Barons and the Triple-A Charlotte Knights, posting a .250/.277/.406 batting line with 4 home runs and 25 RBI. He became a free agent following the 2019 season. On February 24, 2020, Torres re-signed with the White Sox on a new minor league contract. Torres was released by the White Sox organization on June 26, 2020.

On May 22, 2021, Torres signed with the Olmecas de Tabasco of the Mexican League. However, he was released by the team on June 1 without appearing in a game.

Leones de Yucatán
On December 23, 2021, Torres signed with the Leones de Yucatán of the Mexican League for the 2022 season. He was released on June 1, 2022.

References

External links

1993 births
Living people
Águilas Cibaeñas players
Arizona League Royals players
Birmingham Barons players
Burlington Royals players
Charlotte Knights players
Dominican Republic expatriate baseball players in Mexico
Dominican Republic expatriate baseball players in the United States
Dominican Summer League Royals players
Gigantes del Cibao players
Kansas City Royals players
Leones de Yucatán players
Lexington Legends players
Major League Baseball infielders
Major League Baseball players from the Dominican Republic
Northwest Arkansas Naturals players
Omaha Storm Chasers players
People from Santiago Rodríguez Province
Surprise Saguaros players
White Dominicans
Wilmington Blue Rocks players